Enemy of the Enemy is an album by British band Asian Dub Foundation, released on 3 February 2003. It was the first ADF album to be released following the departure of rapper Deeder Zaman. Following the release of the album, "Fortress Europe" and "Rise to the Challenge" were featured in video games released by Electronic Arts, with the former appearing in Need for Speed: Underground and the latter in FIFA Football 2004.

Track four features Sinéad O'Connor.

Track listing
"Fortress Europe" – 3:50
"Rise to the Challenge" – 4:25
"La Haine" – 3:54
"1000 Mirrors" – 4:55
"19 Rebellions" – 5:22
"Blowback" – 2:56
"2 Face" – 5:15
"Power to the Small Massive" – 4:23
"Dhol Rinse" – 3:18
"Basta" – 4:33
"Cyberabad" – 5:02
"Enemy of the Enemy" – 4:43
"Raj Antique Store (Dry & Heavy Mix)" (Japanese bonus track) – 5:29

Bonus Discs

Album Mix
"Intro" – 4:21
"Fortress Europe" - 3:24
"Blowback" - 1:56
"1000 Mirrors" - 5:36
"Rise to the Challenge" - 2:29
"19 Rebellions" - 3:11
"2 Face" - 1:23
"Fortress Europe" - 3:40
"Power to the Massive" - 2:42
"Cyberabad" - 1:40
"Enemy of the Enemy" - 4:03
"Outro" - 3:11

Re-release Bonus Disc
"One Thousand Mirrors (Visionary Underground Remix)" - 5:19
"Fortress Europe (Jazzwad Remix)" - 6:07
"19 Rebellions (Al Scott Version)" - 5:32
"Assatta Dub" - 4:51
"La Haine (The Bug Remix)" - 4:27
"Fortress Europe (DJ Mehdi Remix)" - 4:43
"Collective Mode (Audio Active Version)" - 6:30
"Jungle Bass" (featuring Indigenous Resistance) - 4:30
"Thousand Mirrors (Ils Remix Club Version)" - 3:16
"Make Trade Fair" - 3:44
"Power to the Small Massive (Sun-J Remix)" - 4:35
"Fortress Europe (Adrian Sherwood Dub Mix)" - 4:09
"La Haine (The Bug Mash Up Mix)" - 4:01
"Police on my Back" (Live with Zebda) - 4:00

Personnel

Steve Chandra Savale (also known as Chandrasonic) : guitars, programming, vocals, tsura
John Ashok Pandit (also known as Pandit G) : turntables, samples, vocals
Sanjay Gulabhai Tailor (also known as Sun J) : effects, mixology, synthesiser
Aniruddha Das (also known as Dr. Das) : bass, programming, vocals
Sinéad O'Connor : vocals on "1000 Mirrors"
Edi Rock (of Racionais MC's) : vocals on "19 Rebellions"
Ed O'Brien : guitar on "Blowback", "Enemy of the Enemy" and "Fortress Europe"

Certifications

References

2003 albums
Asian Dub Foundation albums